Tlaxco may refer to various places in Mexico:

 Tlaxco Municipality, Puebla
 Tlaxco Municipality, Tlaxcala
 Tlaxco, Coxcatlán
 Tlaxco, Xalpatlahuac

See also
 Tlaxco Municipality (disambiguation)